Geko is a Karen language of Burma. Yinbaw is reportedly a variety. Speakers of Geko and Yinbaw are ethnically Kayan, as are speakers of Lahta and Padaung.

Distribution
northern Kayin State: Thandaunggyi township
southern Shan State: Pekhon township
Mandalay Region: Yamethin District
Bago Region: Taungoo District

Yinbaw (population 7,300 as of 1983) is spoken in eastern Shan State and Kayah State.

Dialects
Geker
Gekho
Thaidai (Htideh)

References

Shintani Tadahiko. 2017. The Gokhu language. Linguistic survey of Tay cultural area (LSTCA) no. 111. Tokyo: Research Institute for Languages and Cultures of Asia and Africa (ILCAA).
Shintani Tadahiko. 2018. The Thaidai language. Linguistic survey of Tay cultural area (LSTCA) no. 116. Tokyo: Research Institute for Languages and Cultures of Asia and Africa (ILCAA).

Karenic languages